Neoclinus uninotatus, the Onespot fringehead, is a species of chaenopsid blenny found in the eastern Pacific ocean. It can reach a maximum length of  TL. This species feeds primarily on benthic crustaceans. It has been known to live for up to 7 years.

References
 Hubbs, Clark, 1953 (26 Feb.) Revision and systematic position of the blenniid fishes of the genus Neoclinus. Copeia 1953 (no. 1): 11–23.

uninotatus
Fish described in 1953
Taxa named by Clark Hubbs